The 2009 FIA GT Algarve 2 Hours was the sixth round of the 2009 FIA GT Championship season.  It took place at the Autódromo Internacional do Algarve, Portugal on 20 September 2009.  Selleslagh Racing Team won their first race of the season while their driver James Ruffier's won his first race in FIA GT.  Pekaracing earned second place while the No. 2 Vitaphone Racing car completed the podium with a pass on the second to last lap of the race.  The No. 51 AF Corse Ferrari won in GT2 followed by the No. 60 Prospeed Competition Porsche and No. 77 BMS Scuderia Italia Ferrari.

Report

Qualifying

Qualifying results
Pole position winners in each class are marked in bold.

† – The No. 2 Vitaphone Maserati was penalized five grid spots after causing an avoidable accident at the 2009 Budapest City Challenge.

Race results
Class winners in bold.  Cars failing to complete 75% of winner's distance marked as Not Classified (NC).

See also 
 2009 Algarve GP2 Series round

References

Algarve